Catherine Hall  (born 1946) is a British academic. She is Emerita Professor of Modern British Social and Cultural History at University College London and chair of its digital scholarship project, the Centre for the Study of the Legacies of British Slavery. Her work as a feminist historian focuses on the 18th and 19th centuries, and the themes of gender, class, race and empire.

Early life and education
Catherine  Barrett (later Hall) was born in 1946 in  Kettering, Northamptonshire. Her father, John Barrett, was a Baptist minister, while her mother, Gladys came from a family of millers. Her parents met at Oxford University, where Gladys was studying history. When Catherine was three, the family moved to Leeds, Yorkshire, and she grew up there in a non-conformist household; both parents were "radical Labour". She went to grammar school, where she says she had an excellent education.

She then attended the University of Sussex at Falmer, but was living between Brighton and London, having met her future husband, Stuart Hall, who lived in London. She found herself out of place among the "stylish, metropolitan types" and bewildered by the emphasis on the multidisciplinary syllabus at Sussex. She moved to the University of Birmingham, where Stuart had moved to set up the Centre for Cultural Studies, and completed a traditional history degree, developing an interest in medieval history.

Advocacy and other interests

Hall was involved in student politics and activism in Birmingham around 1968, but then had a baby, which changed her life. She got involved in the women's movement, became a feminist historian, and co-wrote Family Fortunes with Leonore Davidoff in 1987.

In the early 1960s she participated in a march for Campaign for Nuclear Disarmament.

In 1970 Hall attended the UK's first National Women's Liberation Conference at Ruskin College, Oxford. She was a member of the Feminist Review collective between 1981 and 1997.

Academic career
Hall is a feminist historian, known for her work on gender, class, race and empire between 1700 and 1900.

She was employed as a "gender historian" at the Northeast London Polytechnic (now the University of East London) in the late 1980s, which involved looking at history from a feminist perspective, creating a new discipline subsequently known as feminist history. During this time, the discipline of postcolonialism developed, and she became interested in this topic.

She was appointed Professor of Modern British Social and Cultural History University College London (UCL) in 1998, and was Principal Investigator of the "Legacies of British Slave Ownership" and "Structure and Significance of British-Caribbean Slave Ownership, 1763–1833" research projects. She retired from her professorship on 31 July 2016. 

 she is Emerita Professor of Modern British Social and Cultural History at UCL and chair of its digital scholarship project, the Centre for the Study of the Legacies of British Slavery, on which she has worked since 2009.

Awards and recognition
2016: Offered the Dan David Prize from the Dan David Foundation in Tel Aviv, Israel, which included a £225,000 research fund; however, in support of the Boycott, Divestment and Sanctions movement in, Hall rejected the award, stating that it was "an independent political choice" to do so.

 2018: elected Fellow of the British Academy (FBA)
 2019: Honorary degree from the University of York
2021: Leverhulme Medal, awarded by the British Academy "in recognition of Professor Hall’s impact across modern and contemporary British history, particularly in the fields of class, gender, empire and postcolonial history"

Personal life
Hall met her future husband, cultural theorist and activist Stuart Hall, on a Campaign for Nuclear Disarmament march in the early 1960s, and the two would go on to marry in 1964. The couple had a daughter, Becky, and son, Jess, and the family lived in Birmingham. Stuart was Jamaican, and with mixed-race children, Catherine was aware of the legacy of British colonialism before commencing her academic work on the topic.

Stuart died in 2014. In May 2016, Hall donated 3,000 books from his library to  Housmans bookshop.

Published works

Books
Family Fortunes: Men and Women of the English Middle Class 1780–1850 (1987, new edition 2002, with Leonore Davidoff)
White, Male And Middle-Class: Explorations In Feminism And History (1992)
Gendered Nations: Nationalisms And Gender Order In The Long Nineteenth Century (2000 editor, with Ida Blom and Karen Hagemann)
Defining The Victorian Nation: Class, Race, Gender And The British Reform Act Of 1867 (2000, editor, with Keith McClelland and Jane Rendall)
Cultures Of Empire: Colonisers In Britain And The Empire In Nineteenth And Twentieth Centuries (2000, editor)
Civilising Subjects: Metropole And Colony In The English Imagination, 1830–1867 (2002)
Race, Nation and Empire: Making Histories, 1750 to the Present (2010, editor, with Keith McClelland)
Macaulay and Son: Architects of Imperial Britain (2012)

Articles

 (Full text can also be requested via Researchgate.)

References

External links
UCL Staff Profile

1946 births
Living people
English historians
English feminist writers
People from Kettering
Academics of University College London
Place of birth missing (living people)
British women historians
Feminist historians
Fellows of the British Academy